The Hornchurch Stadium is an athletics and football stadium located on Bridge Avenue in Upminster in the London Borough of Havering, East London, England. It is home to the Hornchurch F.C. and West Ham United L.F.C. football clubs and Havering Mayesbrook Athletics Club.

History
The stadium was opened in 1956 by Hornchurch Urban District Council. It was the home ground of the original Hornchurch F.C. until they were dissolved in 2005.

Facilities
The stadium has a capacity of 3,000, of which 800 is seated and 1,400 is covered. One stand, the 'Riverside', took its name from the River Ingrebourne, a few feet away.

In November 2016, the main stand on the Riverside section of the ground was renamed "The Colin McBride Stand", after former AFC Hornchurch chairman and manager Colin McBride by the AFC Hornchurch Supporters Association

References

External links
Hornchurch Running Track Directory

Upminster
Buildings and structures in the London Borough of Havering
Athletics venues in London
Football venues in London
Football venues in England
Rugby union stadiums in London
Tourist attractions in the London Borough of Havering
Sports venues completed in 1956
1956 establishments in England
Hornchurch F.C.